Colerain High School may refer to:

Colerain High School in Cincinnati, Ohio, United States
Colerain High School in Colerain, North Carolina, United States

It is not to be confused with Coleraine High School, Coleraine, County Londonderry, Northern Ireland.